The Samsung Galaxy A13 is an Android smartphone manufactured by Samsung Electronics. The 4G LTE model was announced on 4 March 2022 and the 5G model was announced on 2 December 2021. The phone has a quad-camera setup with a 50 MP main camera, a 6.6 in (175mm) HD+ Infinity-V display, and a 5000 mAh Li-Po battery. It ships with Android 12.

Design 

The screen of the Galaxy A13 is made of Corning Gorilla Glass 5, and in the 5G model, it is made of glass of unknown manufacture. The body of the 4G model is made of glossy plastic, and the 5G model is made of matte plastic.

The design of the smartphone is similar in comparison to the Samsung Galaxy A32.

At the bottom are the USB-C connector, speaker, microphone and 3.5 mm audio jack. The Galaxy A13 5G has a second microphone on top. On the left side, depending on the Galaxy A13 version, there is a slot for 1 SIM card and a microSD memory card up to 1 TB or for 2 SIM cards and a microSD memory card up to 1 TB or only for 1 SIM card and microSD memory card up to 1 TB in Galaxy A13 5G. On the right side are the volume buttons and the lock button, which has a built-in fingerprint scanner.

The Samsung Galaxy A13 is sold in 4 colors: black, white, blue and peach.

The Samsung Galaxy A13 5G is sold in black and green colors, including blue and orange for the global models.

Specifications

Hardware 
The 4G model received an Exynos 850 processor and a Mali-G52 graphics processor.
The 5G model received a MediaTek MT6833 Dimensity 700 processor with 5G support and a Mali-G57 MC2 graphics processor.
Later A13s model (SM-A137F) received a Mediatek Helio G80 processor.

Battery 
The battery received a volume of 5000 mAh and support for fast charging at 15 W.

Camera 
The Galaxy A13 received a main quad camera of 50 MP, f/1.8 (wide-angle) with phase autofocus + 5 MP, f/2.2 (ultra-wide-angle) with a viewing angle of 123° + 2 MP, f/2.4 (macro) + 2 MP, f/2.4 (depth sensor). Main camera uses four-way pixel binning and true resolution is 12.5 MP.

The front camera has a resolution of 8 MP and an aperture of f/2.2 (wide). The main and front cameras are capable of recording videos in 1080p@30fps resolution.

The Galaxy A13 5G received a primary triple camera of 50 MP, f/1.8 (wide-angle) with phase detection autofocus + 2 MP, f/2.4 (macro) + 2 MP, f/2.4 (depth sensor). The front camera has a resolution of 5 MP and an aperture of f/2.0 (wide-angle). The main and front cameras are capable of recording videos in 1080p@30fps resolution.

Display 
The screen in the Galaxy A13 is PLS TFT LCD, 6.6", FullHD+ (2408 × 1080) with a pixel density of 400 ppi, an aspect ratio of 20:9 and an Infinity-V (drop-shaped) cutout for the front camera.

The screen in the Galaxy A13 5G is PLS TFT LCD, 6.5", HD+ (1600 × 720) with a pixel density of 270 ppi, an aspect ratio of 20:9, a display refresh rate of 90 Hz and an Infinity-V (drop-shaped) cutout for the front camera.

Memory 
The Galaxy A13 is sold in configurations of 3/32, 4/64, 4/128 and 6/128 GB. 

The Galaxy A13 5G is sold in a 4/64 GB configuration.

Software 
The operating system is Android 12 with One UI 4.1 and has upgraded to Android 13 with One UI 5.0.

Reception 
The Verge noted that the device was a good budget option and stated that it had good battery life and performance but a weaker screen and camera.

References 

Samsung Galaxy
Mobile phones introduced in 2021
Mobile phones introduced in 2022
Android (operating system) devices
Samsung smartphones
Mobile phones with multiple rear cameras